5144 Achates  is a large Jupiter trojan from the Trojan camp, approximately  in diameter. It was discovered on 2 December 1991, by American astronomer Carolyn Shoemaker at the Palomar Observatory in southern California, United States. The assumed C-type asteroid has a rotation period of 6 hours, a notably eccentric orbit of 0.27, and belongs to the 40 largest Jupiter trojans. It was named after Achates from Greco-Roman mythology.

Orbit and classification 

Achates is a dark Jovian asteroid orbiting in the trailing Trojan camp at Jupiter's  Lagrangian point, 60° behind its orbit in a 1:1 resonance (see Trojans in astronomy). This Jupiter trojan is also a non-family asteroid of the Jovian background population.

It orbits the Sun at a distance of 3.8–6.6 AU once every 11 years and 10 months (4,331 days; semi-major axis of 5.2 AU). Its orbit has a high eccentricity of 0.27 and an inclination of 9° with respect to the ecliptic. Achates has the most eccentric orbit of all larger Jupiter trojans with an absolute magnitude brighter than 11.

The body's observation arc begins with a precovery taken at the Goethe Link Observatory in May 1949, or more than 42 years prior to its official discovery observation at Palomar.

Physical characteristics 

Achates is an assumed, carbonaceous C-type asteroid.

Rotation period 

Several rotational lightcurve of Achates have been obtained from photometric observations by  Robert Stephens, Stefano Mottola and Lawrence Molnar since 1992. The best-rated measurement made at the robotic Calvin–Rehoboth Observatory in February 2007, gave a rotation period of 5.958 hours with a brightness amplitude of 0.32 magnitude.

Diameter and albedo 

According to the surveys carried out by the Japanese Akari satellite, the NEOWISE mission of NASA's Wide-field Infrared Survey Explorer, and the Infrared Astronomical Satellite IRAS, Achates measures between 80.96 and 91.91 kilometers in diameter and its surface has an albedo between 0.0576 and 0.074. The Collaborative Asteroid Lightcurve Link derives an albedo of 0.0526 and a diameter of 91.82 kilometers based on an absolute magnitude of 9.0.

Naming 

This minor planet was named from Greco-Roman mythology after Achates ("fidus Achates"), a close friend and brother-in-arms of the Trojan hero Aeneas in Virgil's Aeneid. After the Trojan War, Achates commanded his own ship in the wandering fleet of Trojans as they sought to establish a new city. Together with Aeneas, he descended into the underworld to find Aeneas' father, Anchises. The official naming citation was published by the Minor Planet Center on 4 June 1993.

Notes

References

External links 
 Asteroid Lightcurve Database (LCDB), query form (info )
 Dictionary of Minor Planet Names, Google books
 Discovery Circumstances: Numbered Minor Planets (5001)-(10000) – Minor Planet Center
 
 

005144
Discoveries by Carolyn S. Shoemaker
Named minor planets
19911202